Fred Jent (1894 – 14 August 1979) was a Swiss writer. His work was part of the literature event in the art competition at the 1936 Summer Olympics.

References

1894 births
1979 deaths
Swiss male writers
Olympic competitors in art competitions
Place of birth missing